Lego is a Sakalava musician who performs accordion music in the traditional style of the coastal regions of Madagascar. In addition to his acclaim as a musician, Lego is also known for having lost his sight as a child, and for being the half-brother of Malagasy superstar Rossy. Lego has released numerous albums and has toured regularly on the international world music circuit.

See also
Music of Madagascar

Notes

References
 

Malagasy musicians
1973 births
Living people
Sakalava
Blind musicians